Ronald Leslie Bassett  DSM (10 April 1924 – March 1996) was a British writer and novelist. He wrote numerous works of historical fiction, sometimes under the pseudonym of  "William Clive".  He received many awards for his medical and pharmaceutical writing.

Personal life
Bassett was born in London to George William Bassett, a bank clerk, and Louisa (Vine) Bassett. He attended high school in London, and while in the military married Ivy Owens on 21 November 1944. His first wife died and he later married Sylvia Cruttwell on 6 November 1956, and they had two children.

Military
Bassett joined the King's Royal Rifle Corps as a rifleman in 1938 and then transferred to the Royal Artillery as a gunner. In 1940 he transferred to the Royal Navy, where he worked in the communications branch. He served as a radio operator on the heavy cruiser  during the Bismarck action and during the North African landings. Bassett was a radio operator on a landing craft during the Normandy invasion. As a non-commissioned officer during the Second World War he received the Distinguished Service Medal for bravery and resourcefulness. He remained in the navy after the war, and served on an aircraft carrier in the Korean War zone. He retired from the navy in 1954 as commander.

Later life
In 1956, Bassett went to work for Smith, Kline & French Laboratories Ltd. as a public relations officer, and remained with them until 1966. After devoting himself solely to writing for three years, in 1969 he returned to the pharmaceutical corporate world going to work as a public relations officer for E. R. Squibb & Sons, a post he held until 1975 when he and his wife retired to Surrey.

Fiction
Bassett's historical fiction includes The Carthaginian (1963), The Pompeians (1965), Amorous Trooper (1968), and Blood of an Englishman: A Novel of the Siege of Cawnpore (1975). His novel Witchfinder General (1966) was made into the controversial 1968 film of the same title directed by Michael Reeves and starring Vincent Price.

Awards
Among Bassett's awards are:
British Medical Association – Silver medal
1964 for "Small Price to Pay"
1965 for "Interuterine Contraception" and "Hypertension"
British Medical Association – Gold medal
1966 for "The Right to Work"
1967 for "Seven Ages of Psychiatry"

Notes

References
 Gale Research Co. (2001) "Ronald Bassett 1924–" Contemporary Authors Gale Research Co., Detroit

1924 births
1996 deaths
20th-century British novelists
British male novelists
British medical writers
British historical fiction writers
King's Royal Rifle Corps soldiers
Recipients of the Distinguished Service Medal (United Kingdom)
Royal Navy personnel of World War II
Royal Navy officers
20th-century British male writers
20th-century British writers
British Army personnel of World War II
Royal Artillery soldiers
Royal Navy personnel of the Korean War
Military personnel from London